The Big Trip was a travel show that was originally broadcast on BBC Two's DEF II strand in 1994.  Aimed at the young backpacking viewers and produced by the team responsible for Rough Guide, it was the last series commissioned by Janet Street Porter. The show was narrated by both Brenda Emmanus, who stepped in to replace comedian Jeff Green for series 1, and then Lisa I'Anson, for series 2. It followed three groups of young presenters who travelled across the United States, Australia and Indonesia and Europe. The travel show ran for seven episodes, and began airing from 21 September 1994.

Following the first series on BBC Two, it returned for a second series in 1995.

Presenters:
Jeff Green
Brenda Emmanus
Lisa I'Anson
Harry Gibb
Maura Currie
Roddy Thompson
Suzanne Lavery
Amanda Brady

References 

Travel Channel original programming
British travel television series
1994 British television series debuts
1995 British television series endings
Television shows set in Australia
Television shows set in Europe
Television shows set in Indonesia
Television shows set in the United States